The Rolling Stone Interview is a feature article in the American magazine Rolling Stone that sheds light on notable figures from the worlds of music, popular culture, or politics. Editor Jann Wenner has said that the interview is "part[ly] based on The Paris Review, which featured definitive interviews with writers like Ernest Hemingway and John Steinbeck, exploring their lives, their philosophy and their technique".

Subjects of the interviews have ranged from former presidential candidate John Kerry to the landmark December 1970 interview with John Lennon. The Rolling Stone Interviews: 1967–1980: Talking With the Legends of Rock and Roll (1989) is a collection of significant interviews from the magazine's first 15 years.

Selected interviews 

Woody Allen, April 9, 1987
Joan Baez, April 14, 1983
Chuck Berry, June 14, 1969
Bono, 2005
David Bowie, February 12, 1976
Marlon Brando, May 20, 1976
Tim Burton, July 9, 1992
David Byrne, April 21, 1988
Johnny Carson, March 23, 1979
Noam Chomsky, May 28, 1992
Eric Clapton, May 11, 1968; July 18, 1974; June 20, 1985; October 17, 1991
Bill Clinton, September 17, 1992
Francis Ford Coppola, November 1, 1979
Elvis Costello, September 2, 1982
Bo Diddley, February 12, 1987
Bob Dylan, November 29, 1969; January 26, 1978; November 16, 1978; June 21, 1984
Clint Eastwood, July 4, 1985
Cass Elliot, October 26, 1968
Daniel Ellsberg, November 8, 1973
The Everly Brothers, May 8, 1986
John Fogerty, February 21, 1970
Jerry Garcia, January 20, 1972; November 30, 1989
Bob Geldof, December 5, 1985
George Harrison, October 22, 1987
Mick Jagger, October 12, 1968; June 29, 1978; December 14, 1995
Steve Jobs, 2003
Elton John, August 16, 1973
John Lennon, November 23, 1968; January 21 & February 4, 1971; June 5, 1975
Little Richard, May 28, 1969
Madonna, June 13, 1991
Rachel Maddow, June 2017
Steve Martin, February 18, 1982
Paul McCartney, January 31, 1974
Stanley McChrystal, June 25, 2010
John Mellencamp, January 18, 1986
Joni Mitchell, July 26, 1979
Jack Nicholson, March 29, 1984; August 14, 1986
Sinéad O'Connor, March 7, 1991
Jimmy Page and Robert Plant, March 13, 1975
Brad Pitt, 2008
Bonnie Raitt, May 3, 1990
Lou Reed, May 4, 1989
Keith Richards, August 19, 1971; November 12, 1981; October 6, 1988
Linda Ronstadt, October 19, 1978
Axl Rose, August 10, 1989; April 2, 1992
Bernie Sanders, December 3, 2015; May 31, 2016 
Carly Simon and James Taylor, January 4, 1973
Paul Simon, July 20, 1972
Slash, January 24, 1991
Grace Slick, November 12, 1970
Patti Smith, July 27, 1978
Susan Sontag, October 4, 1979
Bruce Springsteen, December 6, 1984
Howard Stern, March 16, 2011
Sting, February 11, 1988
Michael Stipe, March 5, 1992
Pete Townshend, September 28, 1968
Tina Turner, October 23, 1986
Desmond Tutu, November 21, 1985
Steven Tyler, November 3, 1994; May 12, 2011
Tom Wolfe, August 21, 1980
Neil Young, June 2, 1988
Frank Zappa, July 20, 1968

Notes

Interviews
Rolling Stone